Soil mesofauna are invertebrates between 0.1mm and 2mm in size, which live in the soil or in a leaf litter layer on the soil surface. Members of this group include nematodes, mites, springtails (collembola), proturans, pauropods, rotifers, earthworms, tardigrades, small spiders, pseudoscorpions, opiliones (harvestmen), enchytraeidae such as potworms, insect larvae, small isopods and myriapods.  They play an important part in the carbon cycle and are likely to be adversely affected by climate change.

Soil mesofauna feed on a wide range of materials including other soil animals, microorganisms, animal material, live or decaying plant material, fungi, algae, lichen, spores, and pollen. Species that feed on decaying plant material open drainage and aeration channels in the soil by removing roots. Fecal material of soil mesofauna remains in channels which can be broken down by smaller animals.

Soil mesofauna do not have the ability to reshape the soil and, therefore, are forced to use the existing pore space in soil, cavities, or channels for locomotion. Soil Macrofauna, earthworms, termites, ants and some insect larvae, can make the pore spaces and hence can change the soil porosity, one aspect of soil morphology. Mesofauna contribute to habitable pore spaces and account for a small portion of total pore spaces.  Clay soils have much smaller particles which reduce pore space.  Organic material can fill small pores.  Grazing of bacteria by bacterivorous nematodes and flagellates, soil mesofauna living in the pores, may considerably increase Nitrogen mineralization because the bacteria are broken down and the nitrogen is released.

In agricultural soils, most of the biological activity occurs in the top , the soil biomantle or plow layer, while in non-cultivated soils, the most biological activity occurs in top  of soil.  The top layer is the organic horizon or  O horizon, the area of accumulation of animal residues and recognizable plant material.  Animal residues are higher in nitrogen than plant residues with respect to the total carbon in the residue.  Some Nitrogen fixation is caused by bacteria which consume the amino acids and sugar that are exuded by the plant roots.  However, approximately 30% of nitrogen re-mineralization is contributed by soil fauna in agriculture and natural ecosystems.  Macro- and mesofauna break down plant residues to release Nitrogen as part of nutrient cycling.

References 

Soil biology
Zoology